Cahenia is a genus of flies in the family Tachinidae.

References

Tachinidae